Dre Day: July 5th 1970 is a posthumous 2008 album by Hyphy Bay Area rapper Mac Dre.

Track listing

 Since "84", "94", "04"  (featuring Dubee and Mistah F.A.B.) 
 Doogie wit It
 All da Time  (featuring Chop da Hookman, Bavgate and Johnny Ca$h) 
 G.A.M.E  (featuring B-Legit) 
 West Coast Pimp  (featuring J-Diggs) 
 Hoes  (featuring PSD and Keak da Sneak) 
 Giggin'  (featuring Mistah F.A.B. and Dem Hoodstarz) 
 Feelin' Myself  (featuring Keak da Sneak and Johnny Ca$h) 
 Hands Made 4 Holdin Grands  (featuring Dubee) 
 Roll Wit  (featuring Zion I) 
 On da Run  (featuring J-Diggs, Mac Mall, Duna and Boss Hogg) 
 6-500  (featuring Rydah J. Klyde) 
 Quarter Backin'  (featuring Dubee and J-Hype) 
 Get Stupid  (featuring Cutthoat Committee) 
 Treal Man  (featuring Mac Minister and Swamp Kat) 
 My Life's a Movie  (featuring Messy Marv) 
 Crestside  (featuring Dubee, J-Diggs and Da' Unda' Dogg) 
 Thizzle Dance  (featuring Miami and Keak da Sneak)

References

2008 albums
Mac Dre albums
Thizz Entertainment albums